Anthony, Antony or Tony Turner may refer to:

 Anthony Turner (actor) (  1622–1659), English actor
 Anthony Turner (martyr) (1628–1679), English Jesuit and martyr
 Tony Turner (diver) (born 1933), British diver
 Tony Turner (priest) (born 1930), English Anglican clergyman
 Tony Turner (scientist) (born 1950), English academic in the field of biosensors
 Tony Turner (20th-century actor), British actor in Her Naked Skin
 Tony Turner (songwriter), Canadian writer of the protest song "Harperman"

See also
 Toni Turner, President of TrendStar Group, Inc.